The Electoral (Revision of Constituencies) Act 1935 (No. 5) was a law in Ireland which replaced the Dáil constituencies which had been defined in the Electoral Act 1923.

Unlike the constituencies in the 1923 Act, it included many instances of crossing county boundaries to form constituencies. It reduced the number of seats in the Dáil by 15 from 153 to 138. This was in combination with the abolition of the two university constituencies, which was effected by the Constitution (Amendment No. 23) Act 1936 and the Electoral (University Constituencies) Act 1936, transferring all those on the register for university constituencies to the register for geographical constituencies.

It came into effect on the dissolution of the 8th Dáil, and would be first used at the 1937 general election held on 21 July for the 9th Dáil. The constituencies would remain in operation at the 1938, 1943 and 1944 general elections.

The constituencies were revised again by the Electoral (Amendment) Act 1947, which created a scheme of constituencies which came into effect at the dissolution of the 12th Dáil and was first used at 1948 general election.

Constituencies 1937–1948
Explanation of columns
 Created: The year of the election when a constituency of the same name was last created.
 Seats: The number of TDs elected from the constituency under the Act.
 Change: Change in the number of seats since the last distribution of seats (which had been in force from 1923).

Abolished constituencies

See also
Elections in the Republic of Ireland

References

Electoral Acts (Ireland)
1935 in Irish law
Acts of the Oireachtas of the 1930s